Ponta da Piedade (Portuguese for "point of mercy") is a headland with a group of rock formations along the coastline of the town of Lagos, in the Portuguese region of the Algarve. Consisting of yellow-golden cliff-like rocks up to 20 meters high, they are one of the most famous touristic attractions of Portugal. Several grottos in Ponta da Piedade can be visited by boat. The location also contains a lighthouse, dating back to 1913.

Lagos, Portugal
Geologic formations of Europe